The following is a timeline of the history of the city of Chattanooga, Tennessee, United States.

19th century

 1838 – Cherokee Nation removed from Chattanooga, marched out to 'Indian Territory' (now Oklahoma) on the 'Trail of Tears'
 1840 – James Enfield Berry becomes mayor.
 1849 – Western & Atlantic Railroad begins operating.
 1851 – City chartered.
 1854 – Nashville & Chattanooga Railway in operation.
 1860 - Population: 2.545.
 1862 – June: First Battle of Chattanooga.
 1863
 September: Occupation by Union forces begins.
 November 24: Battle of Lookout Mountain.
 November 25: Battle of Missionary Ridge.
 1866
 March: Occupation by Union forces ends.
 Chartered as a city.
 1867 – March: The largest flood in the city's recorded history.
 1869 – Chattanooga Times newspaper begins publication.
 1870 - Population: 6,093.
 1880 - Population: 12,892.
 1882 – Walnut Street Temple dedicated.
 1886 - University of Tennessee at Chattanooga established.
 1890
 Walnut Street Bridge built.
 Population: 29,100.
 1900 - Population: 30,154.

20th century

 1905 – Chattanooga Public Library opens.
 1906 - Lynching of Ed Johnson
 1909 – Hixson High School founded.
 1910 - Population: 44,604.
 1917 – Market Street Bridge built.
 1921 – Tivoli Theatre opens.
 1923 – Chattanooga Theatre Centre founded.
 1924 – Memorial Auditorium built.
 1925 – WDOD radio begins broadcasting.
 1930 – Population: 119,798.
 1933 – Chattanooga Free Press newspaper begins publication.
 1935 – Electric Power Board of Chattanooga established.
 1937 – Chattanooga Zoo at Warner Park established.
 1940 – Population: 128,163.
 1950 – Population: 131,041.
 1954 – WDEF-TV (television) begins broadcasting.
 1956 – WRGP-TV (television) begins broadcasting.
 1959 – Olgiati Bridge built.
 1960 – Population: 130,009.
 1961 – Tennessee Valley Railroad Museum founded.
 1965 - Chattanooga State Community College established.
 1972 – Twelve Tribes (religious group) and National Knife Museum founded.
 1975 – Marilyn Lloyd becomes U.S. representative for Tennessee's 3rd congressional district.
 1980 – Population: 169,565.
 1983 – Chattanooga African-American Museum established.
 1983-97 – Gene Roberts began city's longest term as mayor. 
 1984 – Veterans Memorial Bridge built.
 1986 - Chattanooga School for the Arts & Sciences established.
 1987 – Fellowship of Southern Writers headquartered in Chattanooga.
 1989 – Federal judge ordered change in city governance to city council system to allow for more demographically-correct African-American political representation in City Council (Brown vs. Board of Commissioners of the City of Chattanooga)
 1992 – Tennessee Aquarium opened.
 1995 – International Towing and Recovery Hall of Fame and Museum established.
 1997
 City website online (approximate date).
 Jon Kinsey elected mayor.
 1999 – Chattanooga Times Free Press newspaper in publication.

21st century

 2001 – Bob Corker elected mayor.
 2005
 Hunter Museum of American Art building expanded.
 Ron Littlefield elected mayor.
 2009 - Ron Littlefield re-elected mayor.
 2010
 Electric Power Board's one gigabit per second Internet service began.
 Population: 167,674.
 2011
 Volkswagen Chattanooga Assembly Plant began operating.
 Chuck Fleischmann elected U.S. representative for Tennessee's 3rd congressional district.
 2013 – Andy Berke elected mayor.
 2015 – Lone-wolf terrorist shooting, killed five military members and injuring three others.
 2017 – Andy Berke re-elected mayor.

See also
 Chattanooga history
 List of mayors of Chattanooga, Tennessee
 Timelines of other cities in Tennessee: Clarksville, Knoxville, Memphis, Murfreesboro, Nashville

References

Bibliography

Published in the 19th century
 
 
 
 
 
 
 
 

Published in the 20th century
 
 
 . 1911-
 
 
 
   (Includes information about Chattanooga)

Published in the 21st century

External links

 Chattanooga Public Library. Local History
 Items related to Chattanooga, various dates (via Digital Public Library of America).
 

 
Chattanooga